Specific potential energy is potential energy of an object per unit of mass of that object.

In a gravitational field it is the acceleration of gravity times height,   .

See also
Specific mechanical energy

Energy (physics)